Gastrochilus affinis is a species of orchid. It is native to Yunnan, Nepal, Assam, Bhutan and Sikkim.

References 

affinis
Orchids of India
Flora of Nepal
Orchids of Yunnan
Flora of Assam (region)
Flora of Sikkim
Plants described in 1898